Akiem Jamar Hicks (born November 16, 1989) is an American football defensive end who is a free agent. He was drafted by the New Orleans Saints in the third round of the 2012 NFL Draft and has also played for the New England Patriots and Chicago Bears. He played college football at Sacramento City College and at the University of Regina.

Early years
A native of Sacramento, California, Hicks was born in Elk Grove, attended Del Campo High School in Fair Oaks, and began his college career at Sacramento City College. After the 2008 season, he was rated as a top junior college player and signed to play at LSU. However, recruiting violations by LSU made him ineligible for the 2009 season; unable to transfer to another American football program, he went to work at a DirecTV call center in Colorado Springs, Colorado while he considered his next move. Hicks had an offer to play for the Toronto Argonauts of the Canadian Football League, but decided instead to continue his education and college football career with the Regina Rams of the Canada West Universities Athletic Association. After his first season at Regina, he was drafted by the Omaha Nighthawks of the United Football League, but again decided to stay in college.  In his second year at Regina, he made 42 tackles and 6 1/2 sacks and was named the CWUAA's top lineman. A strong performance in the East-West Shrine Game increased his profile with NFL scouts.

Professional career

New Orleans Saints

2012

The Saints drafted Hicks in the third round of the 2012 NFL Draft; it was the Saints' first pick of the draft. He became the ninth Canadian Interuniversity Sport player to be selected in the NFL draft, and the second-highest NFL draft pick in CIS history (behind only Mike Schad, a first round pick in 1986). As a rookie in 2012, Hicks played 14 games making 20 tackles, a pass defended, and a forced fumble.

2013
In 2013, Hicks started all 16 games making 43 tackles and 4.5 sacks.

2014
In 2014, he played 15 games with 42 tackles, two sacks, and two passes defended.

2015
To begin the 2015 season with the Saints, Hicks played three games with three tackles.

New England Patriots
On September 30, 2015, Hicks was traded to the New England Patriots for tight end Michael Hoomanawanui.

On December 20, 2015, Hicks scored a touchdown in the Patriots' 33–16 win against the Tennessee Titans, recovering the ball for a touchdown after a Chandler Jones strip sack. For the remainder of the 2015 season with the Patriots, Hicks played 13 games with 21 tackles, three sacks, and a fumble recovery for a touchdown. Overall in 2015, combined with both teams, Hicks played 16 games with 24 tackles. The Patriots finished the season with a 12–4 record to clinch an AFC East division title until losing to the Denver Broncos in the AFC Championship game by a score of 20–18.

Chicago Bears

2016
On March 13, 2016, Hicks signed a two-year contract with the Chicago Bears. On September 11, 2016, Hicks made his debut as a Chicago Bear against the Houston Texans, recording 3 tackles and a forced fumble. On September 23, 2016, Hicks was fined $18,231 for roughing the passer, regarding a helmet-to-helmet hit on Carson Wentz in Week 2 against the Eagles. On October 2, 2016, Hicks recorded his first sack of the season on Matthew Stafford and the Detroit Lions. On October 31, 2016, Hicks recorded two sacks against the Minnesota Vikings. On December 4, 2016, Hicks recorded 10 tackles plus two sacks and a forced fumble in a 26–6 win over the San Francisco 49ers, earning him NFC Defensive Player of the Week. On December 11, 2016, Hicks recorded a sack against the Detroit Lions. Hicks's seventh sack of the season was a career-high.

2017
On September 9, 2017, Hicks signed a four-year, $48 million contract extension with the Bears.

On September 10, against the Atlanta Falcons in the season opener at Soldier Field, Hicks had two sacks in the 23–17 loss.

2018

During Week 4 of the 2018 season against the Tampa Bay Buccaneers, Hicks was ejected for pushing an official out of the way after being involved in a fight with Buccaneers offensive lineman Ali Marpet. Hicks was not suspended, but was fined $33,425.

In week 11 against the Minnesota Vikings, Hicks sacked quarterback Kirk Cousins once, along with recording a career-best five tackles for a loss. The Bears won the game 25–20.

Hicks also saw occasional playing time on offense during the season. In a week 13 loss to the New York Giants, he lined up at upback alongside defensive end Roy Robertson-Harris on fourth-and-goal from the Giants' one-yard line. Receiving the hand-off, Hicks ran for the one-yard touchdown. The play was dubbed "Freezer Left" by head coach Matt Nagy in tribute to William "The Refrigerator" Perry, a defensive lineman who sporadically played fullback for the Bears in the 1980s. Hicks was the first Bears defensive player to score a touchdown on offense since linebacker Brian Urlacher caught a touchdown pass from punter Brad Maynard on a fake field goal in 2001.

Hicks finished the season with 55 tackles, 7.5 sacks, and 3 forced fumbles. He received an overall grade of 91.6 from Pro Football Focus in 2018, which ranked as the 4th highest grade among all qualifying interior defenders. He was named to the 2019 Pro Bowl roster.

2019
In week 1 against the Green Bay Packers, Hicks recorded the first sack of his season on Aaron Rodgers as the Bears lost 10–3.
In week 3 against the Washington Redskins, Hicks recovered a fumble forced by teammate Khalil Mack before exiting the game with a knee injury. Without Hicks, the Bears won the game 31–15. On October 15, the Bears placed Hicks on injured reserve after an elbow injury. He was designated for return from injured reserve on December 2, 2019, and began practicing with the team again. He was activated on December 14, 2019.
Hicks made his return in a game against the Packers, but reaggravated the injury during the game.  He did not play another down for the rest of the season.

2020
Hicks made his return from injury in Week 1 against the Detroit Lions and sacked Matthew Stafford once during the 27–23 win.
In Week 2 against the New York Giants Hicks recorded another sack, this time on Daniel Jones during the 17–13 win.

2021
Hicks started his 2021 season with a half sack in a Week 1 game against the Los Angeles Rams sacking Matthew Stafford in a 34–14 loss. Hicks played in weeks 2 and 3 and was injured for weeks 4 and 5.  Hicks came back for week 6 to face Aaron Rodgers and the Green Bay Packers, where he recorded another sack in a 24–14 loss. Hicks was injured again for week 7 but would come back to play in two more games before the Chicago Bears week 10 bye. Hicks again missed weeks 11–14 with a ankle sprain before coming back in week 15 against the Minnesota Vikings and sacked Kirk Cousins 2 times in a home game that saw Kirk Cousins throw for a career low in yards of only 87 in a 17–9 loss.

Tampa Bay Buccaneers
On June 2, 2022, Hicks signed with the Tampa Bay Buccaneers.

NFL career statistics

References

External links
 
 Regina Rams bio
 NFL draft scout profile
 New Orleans Saints bio

1989 births
Living people
African-American players of American football
African-American players of Canadian football
American football defensive tackles
Canadian football defensive linemen
Chicago Bears players
LSU Tigers football players
National Conference Pro Bowl players
New England Patriots players
New Orleans Saints players
People from Fair Oaks, California
Players of American football from California
Regina Rams players
Sacramento City Panthers football players
Sportspeople from Elk Grove, California
Tampa Bay Buccaneers players
21st-century African-American sportspeople
20th-century African-American people
Brian Piccolo Award winners